American singer Nicole Scherzinger has been appeared various music videos, films, television series and programs. Scherzinger first appeared on television as a contestant and eventually a member Eden's Crush on Popstars USA; a show aimed to find new talent to form a group. Following the band's dissolution in 2002, Scherzinger took a detour in acting and guest-starred in television shows such as My Wife and Kids (2002) and had a cameo in the independent comedy, Chasing Papi (2003).

Her role as the lead singer of the Pussycat Dolls spotlighted her as a singer, which led to collaborating with other artists and appeared in three music videos in 2006, including a collaboration with P. Diddy's "Come to Me". The following year, she released her first music videos as a solo artist for "Whatever U Like" and "Baby Love" from her shelved solo project, Her Name is Nicole. In 2009, the music video for "Jai Ho (You Are My Destiny)" received a MTV Video Music Award nomination. After the group's hiatus, Scherzinger became a judge on The Sing-Off for its two first seasons and won the tenth season of Dancing with the Stars.

After her stint as guest judge on the British X Factor was favorably received by viewers and producers, Scherzinger was hired to be a main judge on the first season of the American X Factor. Her role was met with several controversies while her performance was panned by critics. Meanwhile, Scherzinger's debut album Killer Love (2011), released music videos for the singles "Poison", "Don't Hold Your Breath", "Right There", "Wet" and "Try with Me". The following year, Scherzinger briefly appeared in Barry Sonnenfeld's Men in Black 3 for which she received a Teen Choice Award nomination,
and found greater success as a judge on the British X Factor where she appeared as a judge for four series (2012–2013, 2016-2017). She received a nomination for National Television Award for Best TV Judge (2017).

Scherzinger released four music videos from Big Fat Lie (2014), which includes lead single "Your Love". In 2015, Scherzinger appeared on three variety shows; in the United States as contestant won the inaugural season of I Can Do That and co-hosted Best Time Ever with Neil Patrick Harris alongside Neil Patrick Harris and in the United Kingdom appeared as a music panelist in Bring the Noise. She voiced the titular mother's role of Sina in Moana in 2016 and in 2017 starred in the television film Dirty Dancing, a remake of the 1987 film of the same name. Scherzinger is currently appearing as a panelist on The Masked Singer to ratings success.

Music videos

Guest appearances

Film

Television

Commercials

References

External links 

Videography
Videographies of American artists